Pteropurpura plorator is a species of sea snail, a marine gastropod mollusk in the family Muricidae, the murex snails or rock snails.

Description

Distribution

References

 Petit R.E. (2009) George Brettingham Sowerby, I, II & III: their conchological publications and molluscan taxa. Zootaxa 2189: 1–218
 Houart R. (2011) Ocenebra, Pteropurpura, and Ocinebrellus (Gastropoda: Muricidae: Ocenebrinae) in the northwestern Pacific. American Conchologist 39(4): 12–22.

Muricidae
Gastropods described in 1845